Pro-China may refer to the following people that express support for China, its culture, its people, or its government:
 Chinese nationalism
 Pro-China camp, also known as Pro-Beijing camp, either of two political factions:
Pro-Beijing camp (Hong Kong) in Hong Kong
Pro-Beijing camp (Macau) in Macau
 Sinophilia, love for Chinese culture and people

See also
 Sinophobia, the opposite of sinophilia
 Pro-American (disambiguation)